Cootje van Kampen-Tonneman (born 15 September 1921) was a Dutch gymnast. She competed at the 1948 Summer Olympics and the 1952 Summer Olympics.

References

External links
 

1921 births
Possibly living people
Dutch female artistic gymnasts
Olympic gymnasts of the Netherlands
Gymnasts at the 1948 Summer Olympics
Gymnasts at the 1952 Summer Olympics
People from Hoorn
Sportspeople from North Holland